James Chase may refer to:

 James Mitchell Chase (1891–1945), member of the U.S. House of Representatives from Pennsylvania
 James Chase (apothecary) (1636–1717), Apothecary to the Crown and a member of parliament for Great Marlow
 James Everett Chase (1914–1987), American politician
 James Hadley Chase (1906–1985), English writer